Serge Janquin (born August 5, 1943) was a member of the National Assembly of France.  He represented the Pas-de-Calais department between 1993 and 2017,  and was a member of the Socialiste, radical, citoyen et divers gauche group. He did not run for a sixth term in 2017. Ludovic Pajot from the National Front succeeded him.

References

1943 births
Living people
Socialist Party (France) politicians
Deputies of the 12th National Assembly of the French Fifth Republic
Deputies of the 13th National Assembly of the French Fifth Republic
Deputies of the 14th National Assembly of the French Fifth Republic